John Nicolas Rea, 3rd Baron Rea (6 June 1928 – 1 June 2020), commonly known as Nicolas Rea, was a British hereditary peer, doctor and politician.

Early life 
Rea was born in 1928 to James Russell Rea and Betty Rea (née Bevan), and attended Dartington Hall School in Devon, Belmont Hill School in Massachusetts and Dauntsey's School in Wiltshire. He was further educated at Christ's College, Cambridge, where he graduated with a Master of Arts in natural sciences, a Bachelor of Medicine, a Bachelor of Surgery in 1951, and became a Doctor of Medicine (MD) in 1969. At University College Hospital, London, he achieved a Diploma in Obstetrics (DObst RCOG), Diploma in Child Health and a Diploma in Public Health in the time from 1956 to 1965. In 1981, he succeeded to the barony of Rea.

Career 
Rea served as acting sergeant in the Suffolk Regiment between 1946 and 1948, and held various Junior hospital posts between 1954 and 1957. He was research fellow in paediatrics in Ibadan and Lagos in Nigeria from 1962 to 1965, and lecturer in social medicine at St Thomas's Hospital Medical School in London from 1966 to 1968. From 1957 to 1962, and from 1968 to 1993, he also worked as general practitioner in North London.

Politics 
Rea was a member of Amicus, Healthlink Worldwide and the Mary Ward Centre. He supported the Mother and Child Foundation, the Caroline Walker Trust and was honourable secretary of the National Heart Forum. He was a fellow of the Royal Society of Medicine and one of the ninety elected hereditary peers to remain in the House of Lords after the House of Lords Act 1999.

Personal life 
In 1951, Rea married Elizabeth Robinson, with whom he had four sons, Matthew James, Daniel William, Quentin Thomas and John Silas Nathaniel. With other partners he had daughters Bess Connif and Ella ‘Rosy' Amy Benjamin. He married Judith Mary Powell in 1991, the same year he divorced his first wife.

He died on 1 June 2020 at the age of 91.

References

External links 
Lord Rea Profile - Parliament.UK
UK Health Forum

1928 births
2020 deaths
Alumni of Christ's College, Cambridge
Barons in the Peerage of the United Kingdom
Belmont Hill School alumni
British expatriates in Nigeria
Labour Party (UK) hereditary peers
People educated at Dartington Hall School
People educated at Dauntsey's School
Suffolk Regiment soldiers
Hereditary peers elected under the House of Lords Act 1999